Thato Batshegi (born 27 April 1988) is an Olympic boxer from Botswana. Batshegi competed at the 2nd AIBA African 2008 Olympic Qualifying Tournament and the 2006 Commonwealth Games. At the 2008 Olympic qualifying tournament, Batshegi lost to Kenyan Nick Okoth in the gold medal match, but still qualified for the 2008 Summer Olympics.

References

External links
 

1988 births
Living people
Botswana male boxers
Featherweight boxers
Boxers at the 2008 Summer Olympics
Boxers at the 2006 Commonwealth Games
Olympic boxers of Botswana
Commonwealth Games competitors for Botswana